Nick Douglas (born Nicholas Charles Douklias; August 31, 1967) is an American musician, best known for being the bass player of Doro Pesch's band since 1990. He released a solo album in 2001 and a second album in late February 2017. He worked with several other bands and artists, including Chris Caffery and BLAZE.

Biography
Nick was born in Camden, New Jersey, the son of a US Navy Father, and studied architecture before pursuing a career in music. He grew up listening to his Mother's collection of soul, Motown and 60s and 70s British rock records. He began playing bass at age 13 to differentiate from his brother and others in his neighborhood who had opted for the guitar. He took bass guitar lessons in his youth.

At the age of 19, he became a member of the heavy metal band Deadly Blessing from Turnersville, New Jersey, with which he wrote and recorded songs for their first album, titled Ascend from the Cauldron, published by New Renaissance Records in 1988. Two years later, he decided to leave the band and moved to New York City, where he changed his stage name to Nick Douglas and had brief experiences with a few New York area bands. In the summer of 1990, Douglas auditioned for the German hard rock singer Doro Pesch and was chosen among many candidates. Doro is the former singer of the German heavy metal band Warlock, which dissolved in 1989, and went on to become a successful solo artist. Douglas is the bassist of Doro's band since then and recorded several albums with her,  and has toured Europe and all over the world.
 
Nick Douglas has also worked with other bands and musicians. He was in the line-up of Blaze Bayley's band BLAZE for the tours of 2004 and 2005, along with other members of Doro's band Oliver Palotai and Luca Princiotta. In 2005, he was the bass player for Chris Caffery, on his Faces tour and at the end of 2005, he reunited his first band Deadly Blessing, which had been inactive for a long time, for some live performances and the release of an album containing rare and previously unreleased material.

At the end of the 1990s, Douglas began writing and recording songs that eventually made the album, Through the Pane. The album was released independently in 2001 and released in Europe at the end of 2006 on Painkiller Records.

Douglas played bass on a track on Chris Caffery third solo album Pins and Needles in 2007 and went on tour with both Caffery and Doro. He also started to record a new solo album, to which he devoted himself to during the short breaks between tours.

He also played with New York and Pennsylvania based acts like Mike Rocket and the Stars, EBE and the cover band American Tabloid, featuring also the drummer of Doro's band Johnny Dee. He is also the bassist and lead singer of the Nick Douglas band, which features current and former members of Doro's touring band, and performs his own music. Douglas composes and records music in his home studio and licensed some of his compositions to movie and TV companies.

Nick’s second solo album, Regenerations, was released in February and March 2017 in Europe and The US respectively on the German label, Metalville. It went to #4 on the Metal Contraband “most added to radio” charts in North America.

Equipment
Douglas endorses Warwick basses and amplifiers and usually uses a  Katana model on stage and in the studio. He also uses DR Strings and InTune Picks.

Discography

Solo albums
 Through the Pane (2001)
 Regenerations (2017)

With Deadly Blessing
 Ascend from the Cauldron (1988)

With Doro
Studio albums
 Angels Never Die (1993)
 Machine II Machine (1995)
 Love Me in Black (1998)
 Calling the Wild (2000)
 Fight (2002)
 Classic Diamonds (2004)
 Warrior Soul (2006)
 Fear No Evil (2009)
 Raise Your Fist (2012)
 Forever Warriors / Forever United (2018)

Live albums
 Doro Live (1993)
 25 Years in Rock... and Still Going Strong (2010)

With Chris Caffery
 Pins and Needles (2007)

References

External links
Nick Douglas official website
Doro official website

1967 births
Living people
Musicians from Camden, New Jersey
American rock bass guitarists
American heavy metal bass guitarists
American male bass guitarists
Songwriters from New Jersey
Doro (musician)
Guitarists from New Jersey
20th-century American guitarists